Agustina del Carmen Otero Iglesias (4 November 1868 – 10 April 1965), better known as Carolina Otero or La Belle Otero, was a Spanish actress, dancer and courtesan. She had a reputation for great beauty and was famous for her numerous lovers.

Biography

Early years
Agustina del Carmen Otero Iglesias was born in Valga (Pontevedra), Galicia, Spain, daughter of a Spanish single mother, Carmen Otero Iglesias (1844–1903), and a Greek army officer, named Carasson. Her family was impoverished, and as a child she moved to Santiago de Compostela working as a maid. At ten she was raped, and at fourteen she left home with her boyfriend and dancing partner, Paco, and began working as a singer/dancer in Lisbon.

Career as artiste and courtesan

In 1888 Otero found a sponsor named Ernest Jurgens in Barcelona who moved with her to Marseilles in order to promote her dancing career in France. She soon left him and created the character of La Belle Otero, portraying herself as an Andalusian Romani woman.  She was pretty, confident, intelligent, with an attractive figure. It was once said of her that her extraordinarily dark black eyes were so captivating that they were "of such intensity that it was impossible not to be detained before them". She wound up as the star of Folies Bèrgere productions in Paris. One of her most famous costumes featured her voluptuous bosom partially covered with glued-on precious gems, and the twin cupolas of the Carlton Hotel built in 1912 in Cannes are popularly said to have been modeled upon her breasts.
Within a short number of years, Otero was said to be the most sought-after woman in Europe.  She was serving, by this time, as a courtesan to wealthy and powerful men of the day, and she chose her lovers carefully. She associated herself with Kaiser Wilhelm II, Prince Albert I of Monaco, King Edward VII, Kings of Serbia, and Kings of Spain as well as Russian Grand Dukes Peter and Nicholas, the Duke of Westminster and writer Gabriele D'Annunzio. Her love affairs made her notorious, and the envy of many other notable female personalities of the day. Six men reportedly committed suicide after their love affairs with Otero ended, although this has never been substantiated beyond a doubt. It is a fact, however, that two men did fight a duel over her.

Early film
In August 1898, in St-Petersburg, the French film operator Félix Mesguich (an employee of the Lumière company) shot a one-minute reel of Otero performing the famous "Valse Brillante." The screening of the film at the Aquarium music-hall provoked such a scandal (because an officer of the Tsar's army appeared in this frivolous scene) that Mesguich was expelled from Russia.

Later life
She lived out her life in a more and more pronounced state of poverty until she died of a heart attack in 1965 in her one-room apartment at the Hotel Novelty in Nice, France.

Of her heyday and career, Otero once said, "Women have one mission in life: to be beautiful. When one gets old, one must learn how to break mirrors. I am very gently expecting to die."

Notable published works 
 Les Souvenirs et la Vie Intime de la Belle Otero (1926).

In film and literature
In 1954 film  La Belle Otero starring Mexican actress María Félix.
 There is a portrait of "Madame Otero" in Colette's My Apprenticeships.

Gallery

See also
Hispagnolisme
Women in dance

References

Further reading
 Arruíname pero no me abandones. La Bella Otero y la Belle Époque. De Marie-Helène Carbonel i Javier Figuero. Ed. Espasa Calpe, 2003. In Spanish
A Bela Otero, pioneira do cine, Miguel Anxo Fernández In Galician
La passion de Carolina Otero  Ramón Chao, 2001. French novel about the fictional life of the dancer.

External links

La Belle – the Beautiful
La Belle Otèro in the history of the Hotel Carlton 

1868 births
1965 deaths
French vedettes
People from Caldas (comarca)
Mistresses of Edward VII
Spanish female dancers
Spanish stage actresses
Spanish vedettes
Actresses from Galicia (Spain)
Spanish courtesans
19th-century Spanish actresses
20th-century Spanish actresses
Spanish people of Greek descent